The 1998 New Mexico Lobos football team was an American football team that represented the University of New Mexico in the Western Athletic Conference (WAC) during the 1998 NCAA Division I-A football season.  In their first season under head coach Rocky Long, the Lobos compiled a 3–9 record (1–7 against WAC opponents) and were outscored by a total of 397 to 274. 

The team's statistical leaders included Graham Leigh with 2,608 passing yards, Lennox Gordon with 571 rushing yards, and Martinez Williams with 760 receiving yards and 42 points scored.

Schedule

Roster

References

New Mexico
New Mexico Lobos football seasons
New Mexico Lobos football